Hand Hills may refer to:

Hand Hills (Alberta), a hill in Canada
Hand Hills (electoral district), a defunct electoral district in Alberta, Canada